This article lists all of the numbered regional roads in the Regional Municipality of Halton, Ontario, Canada.

References

External links
Halton Region Road Map
Naming of the New North Oakville Transportation Corridor

Ontario county roads
Lists of roads in Ontario
Regional Municipality of Halton